Jacques Glassmann (born 22 July 1962) is a French former footballer who played as a defender.

He is famous for having revealed the bribery scandal involving Olympique de Marseille and his team US Valenciennes. He and teammates Jorge Burruchaga and Christophe Robert were contacted by Marseille player Jean-Jacques Eydelie in order to let Marseille win and, more importantly, not to injure any Marseille player ahead of the 1993 UEFA Champions League Final.

He was eventually awarded the FIFA Fair Play Award in 1995 for having revealed this bribery scandal.

References

External links
 Profile

 

Living people
1962 births
Association football defenders
French footballers
RC Strasbourg Alsace players
FC Mulhouse players
Tours FC players
Valenciennes FC players
Ligue 1 players
Ligue 2 players
Footballers from Mulhouse
Association football controversies
French whistleblowers
French people of German descent